Provalis Research is a Canadian company that specializes in developing and marketing text analytics
tools combining qualitative analysis through QDA Miner with quantitative content analysis and text-mining through WordStat. Headquartered in
Montreal, the company was founded in 1989 by the current president Normand Peladeau.

Provalis Research software products are used by more than 6,000 institutions including universities, governments/NGOs and businesses.

See also
 QDA Miner
 WordStat
Computer assisted qualitative data analysis software
Content analysis
Text mining

References

 http://flightsafety.org/files/Provalis_text_mining_report.pdf
 https://archive.today/20130128075104/http://marketingresourcedirectory.marketingpower.com/company.php?id=1212898&company=Provalis+Research&term=
 http://archive.raabassociatesinc.com/2004/07/provalis-research-wordstat/
 https://web.archive.org/web/20110111225631/http://news.textanalyticsnews.com/textanalytics/connection/25012-Provalis-Research

External links
 

QDA software